Brothers in Heaven, previously known as Come Back to Busan Port, is a 2017 South Korean action crime film starring Sung Hoon, Jo Han-sun and Yoon So-yi and directed by Park Hee-jun.

Plot

Cast
 Sung Hoon as Tae-sung
 Ji Min-hyuk as young Tae-sung
 Jo Han-sun as Tae-joo 
 Yoon So-yi as Chan-mi
 Shin Se-hwi as young Chan-mi
 Kong Jung-hwan as Sang-doo
 Lee Ik-joon as Min-goo
 Park Chul-min as Kang-goo
 Son Byong-ho as Shane

References

External links
 
 

2017 films
2010s Korean-language films
Films directed by Park Hee-jun
South Korean crime action films
2017 crime action films
2010s South Korean films